Herman Van Den Broeck (born 30 January 1956) is a Belgian equestrian. He competed in two events at the 1984 Summer Olympics.

References

External links
 

1956 births
Living people
Belgian male equestrians
Olympic equestrians of Belgium
Equestrians at the 1984 Summer Olympics
People from Merksem